The 1967 Wisconsin Badgers football team represented the University of Wisconsin in the 1967 Big Ten Conference football season.

Schedule

Team players in the 1968 NFL Draft

References

Wisconsin
Wisconsin Badgers football seasons
College football winless seasons
Wisconsin Badgers football